The decade of the 1660s in archaeology involved some significant events.

Explorations

Excavations

Finds
 1661: Athanasius Kircher discovers the ruins of a church in Rome said to have been constructed by the Emperor Constantine on the site of Saint Eustace's vision (later reconstructed as the Santuario della Mentorella).
 1669: One of a pair of gold sun-discs from ca. 2500–2150 BCE is found at Ballyshannon in Ireland.

Events
 1667: Henry Howard donates the first of the Arundel marbles to the University of Oxford (displayed in Ashmolean Museum).

Births
 1690: Edward Lhuyd, Welsh antiquary (d. 1709)

Deaths
 1661: Famiano Nardini, Italian archaeologist (b. c.1600)

References

Archaeology by decade
Archaeology